Michael Meyer may refer to:

 Michael Meyer (translator) (1921–2000), English translator
 Michael Meyer (travel writer), American travel writer
 Michael R. Meyer, journalist and speechwriter
 Michael Meyer (swimmer) (born 1992), South African swimmer
 Michael A. Meyer, German-born American historian of modern Jewish history
 Michael Meyer von Bremen (born 1957), American politician

See also
 Michel Meyer (born 1936), French canoer
 Michael Mayer (disambiguation)
 Michael Myers (disambiguation)